Violette Cordery (married name Hindmarsh; 10 January 1900 – 30 December 1983) was a British racing driver and long distance record breaker.

Early life
Cordery was born in London to Henry Cordery and had an elder sister (Lucy)/Leslie and a younger sister Evelyn who also participated in her driving exploits.

Motoring
Cordery was employed as a driver to captain Noel Macklin of the Royal Naval Volunteer Reserve (RNVR) at Dover. He subsequently invalided out of the Royal Artillery in 1915 and transferred to the RNVR.  Macklin was married to her elder sister Lucy.
 
In 1920 she competed in the South Harting hill climb driving a Silver Hawk, manufactured by Noel Macklin. Cordery also competed in two British Motor Cycle Racing Club handicap events driving an Eric-Campbell, also manufactured by Noel Macklin. In May 1921 she won the ladies' race at the Junior Car Club meeting, averaging .

In 1925 she publicised the new Invicta car, also manufactured by Noel Macklin, by racing and breaking records. At the West Kent Motor Club meeting at Brooklands she won the half mile sprint in a 2.7 litre Invicta, and went on other victories and records.

She traveled through Europe, Africa, India, Australia, the United States, and Canada accompanied by a nurse, a mechanic, and a Royal Automobile Club observer.

In 1929, with her younger sister Evelyn, she covered  of the Brooklands circuit within 30,000 minutes (approximately 20 days, 20 hours) at an average speed  and earning a second Dewar Trophy from the Royal Automobile Club. By 1930 her 4.5-litre Invicta tourer had completed return journeys from London to Monte Carlo, London to John O'Groats and London to Edinburgh.

Family life
Cordery married the racing driver and aviator John Stuart Hindmarsh on 15 September 1931 at Stoke D'Abernon parish church. They had two daughters, of whom Susan married the racing driver Roy Salvadori. Widowed in 1938 by Hindmarsh's death while test flying a Hawker Hurricane, she retired from public life until her death on 30 December 1983 in Oxshott, Surrey. She was cremated at Randalls Park crematorium.

References

External links
British Pathe Video of Violet Cordery's Invicta beginning its 'Round the World' trip in 1927
Tejera, P. (2018). Reinas de la carretera. Madrid: Ediciones Casiopea.

English female racing drivers
English racing drivers
Brooklands people
Land speed record people
English feminists
1900 births
1983 deaths
English rally drivers
Female rally drivers
People from Oxshott
Circumnavigators of the globe